Tono (born April 13, ? in Hiroshima Prefecture, Japan) is a Japanese manga artist. She is the eldest of three children, and her younger sister is manga artist Mitsuru Uguisu, with whom she has a dōjinshi circle called .

Works
Shima Shima Everyday (4 volumes, 1983, Asahi Sonorama)
 (12 volumes, 1993-current, Tokuma Shoten)
 (3 volumes, 1995–1998, Asahi Sonorama)
 (8 volumes, 1997–2007, Asahi Sonorama)
 (2 volumes, 1997, Asahi Sonorama)
 (2 volumes, 1999–2000, Shueisha)
 (1 volume, 1999, Asahi Sonorama)
 (2 volumes, 2003–2007, Shinshokan)
 (1 volume, 2004, Asahi Sonorama)
 (1 volume, 2004, Hakusensha)
 (1 volume, 2004, Asahi Sonorama)
 (1 volume, 2004, Asahi Sonorama))
 (2 volumes, 2004–2006, Akita Shoten)
 (1 volume, 2005, Asahi Sonorama)

External links
 Uguisu Tsūshin (official site) 
 

Year of birth missing (living people)
Living people
Manga artists
People from Hiroshima Prefecture
People from Osaka Prefecture